Qila a Persian, Urdu, and Hindi word meaning a fort or castle used in names of places.

Qila may also refer to:

 Qila, Hebron, a village in Palestine
 Qila (film), a 1998 Bollywood Hindi language drama film

See also
 Kala (disambiguation), Persian alternate spelling of Arabic qal'a
 Qala (disambiguation) or qal'a, Arabic word for fortress or castle
 Qalat (disambiguation), places whose names contain the words Qalat, Qelat, Kalat, Kalaat, Kalut, or Kelat 
 Qalat (fortress)